Alain Claude Bilie By Nze (born 16 September 1967) is a Gabonese politician currently serving as the Prime Minister of Gabon since 9 January 2023.

Biography 
By Nze was born on 16 September 1967 in Makokou. He studied literature at Omar Bongo University in Libreville.

In 2006, he was appointed Minister of Communications, and was elected to Gabon's National Assembly, leaving the latter office in 2011 and the former in 2007, which he left to become Deputy Minister of Transport. In March 2012, By Nze was made an advisor to the President and the government's spokesperson.

By Nze became Communications Minister for a second time in 2015, and was additionally made Minister of State, Minister of the Digital Economy, and Minister of Culture and the Arts in October 2016. In 2018, By Nze was reappointed as Minister of State and Minister of Sports.

In July of 2020, he became the Minister of State and the Minister of Energy and Water Resources. During a cabinet reshuffle in March of 2022, he also became the government's official spokesperson, and in October of 2022, he became a Deputy Prime Minister. On 9 January 2023, By Nze was appointed Prime Minister of Gabon, replacing Rose Christiane Raponda, who resigned to become Vice President.

References 

Living people
1967 births
Prime Ministers of Gabon
21st-century Gabonese politicians
Omar Bongo University alumni
People from Ogooué-Ivindo Province